The women's high jump event at the 1999 European Athletics U23 Championships was held in Göteborg, Sweden, at Ullevi on 30 July and 1 August 1999.

Medalists

Results

Final
1 August

Qualifications
30 July
First 12 to the Final

Participation
According to an unofficial count, 16 athletes from 11 countries participated in the event.

 (1)
 (1)
 (1)
 (3)
 (2)
 (2)
 (2)
 (1)
 (1)
 (1)
 (1)

References

High jump
High jump at the European Athletics U23 Championships